Mission Bay was a bay and the estuary of Mission Creek, on the west shore of San Francisco Bay, between Steamboat Point and Point San Quentin or Potrero Point.  It is now mostly filled in and is the location of the Mission Bay neighborhood of San Francisco.

History
Mission Bay was a lagoon nestled inside of a +500 acre salt marsh and was occupied by year-round tidal waters.  This area was a natural habitat and refuge for large waterfowl populations that included ducks, geese, herons, egrets, ospreys, and gulls.  The Native American tribes who lived in this area were the Costanoan people who spoke eight different languages which delineated between the various tribelets. The tribe most prevalent in the Bay area was the Patwin people who lived in the area for over 5,000 years.  By the early 19th century, European immigrants exposed the population to various deadly diseases that reduced the Patwin population dramatically.

From the 1850s the area was used for shipbuilding and repair, butchery and meat production, and oyster and clam fishing.  Beginning in the mid-1800s, in attempts to make this area suitable for building, Mission Bay, like most of the shoreline of the city of San Francisco, was used as a convenient place to deposit refuse from building projects and debris from the 1906 earthquake.  As the marsh stabilized with the weight of the infill, the area quickly became an industrial district. With the addition of the railroad, Mission Bay became the home to shipyards, canneries, a sugar refinery, and various warehouses.

References

External links
  1852 Coastal Survey Map showing Mission Bay and surrounds  About Mission Bay/Mission Creek from sfsailtours.com accessed March 29, 2015.
  1857 Coastal Survey Map showing Mission Bay and surrounds, with additions to 1852 map to up to 1857 About Mission Bay/Mission Creek from sfsailtours.com accessed March 29, 2015.

Bays of San Francisco Bay
Landforms of San Francisco
Estuaries of California
Wetlands of California
Landforms of the San Francisco Bay Area
Mission Bay (San Francisco)